Katie Larkin Allen (born March 19, 1987) is an American soccer midfielder who played for the Atlanta Beat of Women's Professional Soccer.

College
She played her collegiate years at Brigham Young University where she was a 3-time All American and Hermann Trophy Candidate. She totaled 37 Goals and 17 Assists in 86 appearances for the Cougars.

Professional
After graduating from BYU Katie Larkin was drafted by the Los Angeles Sol of the WPS with the 19th overall pick in 2009. She played one season for the Sol before being entered into the expansion draft and selected by the Atlanta Beat with the 6th overall pick. Following the collapse of the WPS in 2012  Katie Larkin left the Beat and has not returned to the professional ranks.

Statistics

College

Professional

References

External links
 US Soccer player profile
 Atlanta Beat player profile
 BYU Cougars player profile

1987 births
Living people
BYU Cougars women's soccer players
Los Angeles Sol players
Atlanta Beat (WPS) players
American women's soccer players
Women's association football midfielders
Women's Professional Soccer players